4-Hydroxy-TEMPO or TEMPOL, formally 4-hydroxy-2,2,6,6-tetramethylpiperidin-1-oxyl, is a heterocyclic compound. Like the related TEMPO, it is used as a catalyst and chemical oxidant by virtue of being a stable aminoxyl radical. Its major appeal over TEMPO is that is less expensive, being produced from triacetone amine, which is itself made via the condensation of acetone and ammonia. This makes it economically viable on an industrial scale.

In biochemical research, 4-hydroxy-TEMPO has been investigated as an agent for limiting reactive oxygen species.  It catalyzes the disproportionation of superoxide, facilitates hydrogen peroxide metabolism, and inhibits Fenton chemistry. 4-Hydroxy-TEMPO, along with related nitroxides, are being studied for their potential antioxidant properties.

On an industrial-scale 4-hydroxy-TEMPO is often present as a structural element in hindered amine light stabilizers, which are commonly used stabilizers in plastics, it is also used as a polymerisation inhibitor, particularly during the purification of styrene.

It is a promising model substance to inhibit SARS-CoV-2 RNA-dependent RNA polymerase.

See also
 pH neutral aqueous organic flow batteries

References

Free radicals
Amine oxides
Piperidines